Leufroyia leufroyi is a species of sea snail, a marine gastropod mollusk in the family Raphitomidae.

Description
The length of the shell reaches 16 mm, its diameter 7 mm.

Distribution
This species occurs in the Atlantic Ocean and the Mediterranean Sea.; fossils were found in  Upper Pliocene strata in Italy.

References

 Gofas, S.; Le Renard, J.; Bouchet, P. (2001). Mollusca. in: Costello, M.J. et al. (eds), European Register of Marine Species: a check-list of the marine species in Europe and a bibliography of guides to their identification. Patrimoines Naturels. 50: 180-213
 Rolán E., 2005. Malacological Fauna From The Cape Verde Archipelago. Part 1, Polyplacophora and Gastropoda
 Hayward, P.J.; Ryland, J.S. (Ed.). (1990). The marine fauna of the British Isles and North-West Europe: 1. Introduction and protozoans to arthropods. Clarendon Press: Oxford, UK. . 627 pp
 Howson, C. M.; Picton, B. E. (1997). The species directory of the marine fauna and flora of the British Isles and surrounding seas. Ulster Museum Publication, 276. The Ulster Museum: Belfast, UK. . vi, 508 (+ cd-rom) pp.

External links
 Michaud A.L.G. (1828). Description de plusieurs espèces de coquilles vivantes de la Méditerranée. Bulletin d'Histoire Naturelle de la Société Linnéenne de Bordeaux, 2(10): 119-122, 1 plate
 Locard A. (1891). Les coquilles marines des côtes de France. Annales de la Société Linnéenne de Lyon. 37: 1-385
  Brusina S. (1870). Ipsa Chiereghinii Conchylia ovvero contribuzione pella malacologia adriatica. Pisa, Biblioteca Malacologica pp. 280
  Cristofori J. De & Jan G. (1832). Catalogus in IV sectiones divisus rerum naturalium in museo extantium Josephi de Cristofori et Georgii Jan. Parma and Milano
 Delle Chiaje S. (1823-1831). Memorie sulla storia e notomia degli animali senza vertebre del regno di Napoli. Napoli: Fratelli Fernandes (vol. 1), and Società Tipografica (vol. 2-4). Vol. 1, pp. i-xii, 1-84
 Jeffreys J. G. (1862-1869). British Conchology. London, van Voorst : Vol. 1: pp. CXIV + 341
 Philippi, R. A. (1844). Enumeratio molluscorum Siciliae cum viventium tum in tellure tertiaria fossilium, quae in itinere suo observavit. Volumen secundum continens addenda et emendanda, nec non comparationem faunae recentis Siciliae cum faunis aliarum terrarum et com fauna periodi tertiariae. Eduard Anton, Halle 
 Bellardi L. (1877), I molluschi dei terreni terziarii del Piemonte e della Liguria /
 MNHN, Paris: Raphitoma leufroyi (syntype)
 Biolib.cz: Leufroyia leufroyi
 Natural History Museum, Rotterdam: Raphitoma leufroyi

leufroyi
Gastropods described in 1828
Molluscs of the Atlantic Ocean
Molluscs of the Mediterranean Sea